Patrick Madden is a Fulbright Fellow, writer, and professor at Brigham Young University and the Vermont College of Fine Arts.

Madden studied physics as an undergraduate at the University of Notre Dame. After graduating with a BS in 1993, he served a two-year mission for the Church of Jesus Christ of Latter-day Saints in Uruguay, where he met Karina Cabrera, whom he would later marry. Madden completed his master's degree in English at Brigham Young University in 1999 and his PhD in English at Ohio University in 2004. As a Fulbright fellow, he has twice traveled to Uruguay, where he researched the Tupamaros revolutionaries' record-breaking prison break in 1971.

Selected works 
 (2020). Disparates.
 (2016). Sublime Physick.
 (2015) with David Lazar (eds.). After Montaigne: Contemporary Essayists Cover the Essays.
 (2010). Quotidiana (essays).

Awards and honors 
Madden is a 2016 Howard Foundation fellow.

Awards
 2008 AML Award (Personal Essay) for "A Sudden Pull Behind the Heart"
 2010 AML Award (Personal Essay) for Quotidiana
 2010 Foreword INDIES bronze award for Quotidiana
 2011 Independent Publisher Book Awards gold medal for Quotidiana
 2016 Foreword INDIES silver medal for Sublime Physick
 2016 AML Award (Creative Nonfiction) for Sublime Physick
 2017 Independent Publisher Book Awards gold medal for Sublime Physick

Finalist
 2011 finalist for the PEN Center USA Literary Award for Quotidiana
 2017 Council of Literary Magazines and Presses Firecracker Award for Sublime Physick
 2017 15 Bytes Book Award for Sublime Physick

References

Living people
American male essayists
21st-century American essayists
University of Notre Dame alumni
American Latter Day Saint writers
Year of birth missing (living people)
21st-century American male writers
Harold B. Lee Library-related 21st century articles